Miguel de la Torre y Pando, conde de Torrepando (13 December 1786, in Bernales – 1843, in Madrid) was a Spanish General, Governor and Captain General, who served in Spain, Venezuela, Colombia and Puerto Rico during the Spanish American wars of independence and afterwards.

At the age of fourteen he joined the Spanish Army as a soldier during the War of the Second Coalition and quickly distinguished himself and four years later he joined the Guardia de Corps. He fought well during the Spanish War of Independence, reaching the level of colonel by 1814. The following year he was assigned to the military expedition to South America led by Pablo Morillo, and participated in the Spanish reconquest of New Granada.

Promoted to brigadier after New Granada was subdued, La Torre led a royalist army into the Colombian and Venezuelan Llanos. There he unsuccessfully defended Angostura against Manuel Piar in April 1817, and led the loyalist forces down the Orinoco River as they fought their way to the Atlantic Ocean. For the next three years he continued to serve in the Spanish army of Venezuela. During this period he married a Criolla, María de la Concepción Vegas y Rodríguez del Toro, a member of the powerful Rodríguez del Toro family and cousin once removed to Bolívar's late wife, Maria Teresa Rodríguez del Toro y Alayza, and fourth cousin to Bolívar himself.

After the restoration of the Spanish Constitution of 1812 in 1820, the government appointed him governor (jefe político superior) and captain-general of Venezuela, a post he held until 1822. He participated in the negotiations between Bolívar and Morillo and the later meeting in Santa Ana, where the two signed a six-month truce and a treaty regularizing the rules of engagement. After Morillo resigned and left Venezuela at the end of 1820, La Torre became the head of the royalist army, in addition to his other duties. As such he oversaw the loss suffered by royalist forces at the Battle of Carabobo on 24 June 1821, which effectively ended Spanish control of Venezuela. The following year he was replaced in his offices by Francisco Tomás Morales.

Puerto Rico
In 1822, the government appointed him captain general of Puerto Rico, arriving on the island in December 1823. The following year he was also appointed governor of the island. In collaboration with his intendant, Dr. José Domingo Díaz, whom he knew from his days in Venezuela, La Torre's main concern was preventing a rebellion on the island. Carefully controlling the government, he instituted a policy which he called "dance, drink and dice" (baile, botella y baraja, similar to the Romans "bread and circuses"), implying that a well entertained population will not think about revolution. Despite La Torre's wariness of the island's liberal tendencies, his long administration was key to the development of large-scale sugar production on the island, something which had been created decades earlier in Cuba. He also continued supporting from Puerto Rico the few royalist guerrilla bands that existed in Venezuela. Under his watch, roads, homes, bridges, and Spanish fortifications were constructed.

As governor and captain general, he oversaw the temporary restoration of the Spanish Constitution of 1812 in 1836, while a new constitution was written.  He was also made the Count of Torrepando for his services. The following year he retired from public life and settled in Madrid.

Legacy
In Ponce, Puerto Rico there is a street, Calle Simon de la Torre (aka, Calle Torre), leading to Panteón Nacional Román Baldorioty de Castro which is named after him.

See also
Spanish reconquest of New Granada
Reconquista (Spanish America)
Royalist (Spanish American Revolutions)
Captaincy General of Puerto Rico

References

Pérez Tenreiro, Tomás. "Torre y Pando, Miguel de la," Diccionario de Historia de Venezuela. Caracas: Fundacíon Polar, 1997. 
Stoan, Stephen K. Pablo Morillo and Venezuela, 1815-1820. Columbus: Ohio State University Press, 1959.

1786 births
1843 deaths
People from Enkarterri
Spanish generals
La Torre, Miguel de
Royal Governors of Puerto Rico
Spanish colonial governors and administrators
People of the Venezuelan War of Independence
Independence of Venezuela
Spanish military personnel of the Napoleonic Wars